Fukai is a Japanese surname. Notable people with the surname include:

, Japanese businessman and banker
James Fukai (born 1974), American musician
, Japanese footballer
, Japanese footballer
, Japanese composer
, Japanese footballer
, Japanese footballer

See also
Fukai Station, a railway station in Osaka Prefecture, Japan

Japanese-language surnames